Canadian Malting Silos is an abandoned malting factory located along the Lachine Canal in Montreal's Saint-Henri neighbourhood in Quebec, Canada.

Description
On the west side of the complex there are nine violet colored silos. They are covered in treated clay tiles that were manufactured by the Barnett and Record Co. of Minneapolis. These silos are rare examples of using this technique to cover and insulate silos. The cement silos on the other side were added in the 1940s, and were used to store the barley used to produce the malt. The barley was germinated and dried in the buildings that lined Saint-Ambroise Street. The closing of the Lachine Canal in 1970 forced the company to transport its malt by train only, and around 1980, the building was actually too small and the transportation costs too high, so the company abandoned the site and moved into a new malting complex located at 205 Riverside and Mill Street, Montreal. The building was then sold for $500,000 and became a soya and corn storage facility for Quonta Holding Ltd, before it was abandoned in 1989 when Canadian National ceased its rail line service to factories in this area of the canal. The ancient clay silos are now protected as part of the Lachine Canal National Historic Site. They have been so battered from both the elements and vandalism, that it is no longer possible to restore them.

Since being abandoned in 1989, the factory has been covered in graffiti on the outside as well as the inside of the building.  Several videos posted to YouTube have captured footage of the inside and rooftops of the building. An article written by Bernard Lamarche in Le Devoir in May, 2005, described the interior of the building as being in a state of deep disrepair.  Lamarche described the building having a pungent smell, with empty cans of spray paint and broken glass littering the floors.

Canada Malting Building Inspired Projects And Events
In May, 2005, as part of the Obselescences event, and to celebrate the one-hundredth anniversary of the edifice's founding, lighting artist Axel Mongenthaler created a light show by mounting several lights on the rooftop of the building.  As part of a press event organized by the Quartier Éphémère, journalists were invited to put on hard-hats and carry flashlights for a guided tour of the building.  The installation itself consisted of several strobe-lights and green and red lights affixed on the North and South towers, to reflect the buildings connection with the Lachine waterway. A video clip posted by Morgenthaler can be viewed here:

In 2011, Quebec artist Ian Langohr created a mask inspired by the factory. Langohr created the mask from bits of plastic, rubber and metal found on the streets or in the dark corners of Saint-Henri hardware stores, using techniques he picked up working in a mascot production company. In an article published on spacing.ca, Langohr described his inspiration for the work, "I have been fascinated by the old maltage plant since moving to St. Henri in 2009. I find it surrealistic in itself, as it sort of resembles a bizarre collage of industrial buildings. The holes, rust, graffiti and general decaying nature just add to the charm"

See also
 Canada Malting Silos, Toronto
 Victory Soya Mills Silos, Toronto
 Maple Leaf Mills Silos, Toronto (demolished 1983)
 Saint-Henri, Montreal
 Lachine Canal

References

External links
 A La Decouverte de Saint-Henri website
 Saint-Henri Historical Society website

Industrial buildings and structures in Montreal
Grain elevators in Canada
Le Sud-Ouest